Agyamasu is a community in the Bekwai District in the Ashanti Region of Ghana.

Institution 

 Agyamasu Municipal JHS

References 

Ashanti Region
Communities in Ghana